The 26 episodes of the Japanese anime series Tales of the Abyss are jointly produced by Bandai Visual, Namco, and Sunrise, and are based on the PlayStation 2 game of the same name. Taking place in a fantasy world, the story focuses on Luke fon Fabre, a young swordsman whose pampered life turns upside down when he unwittingly becomes the target of a military-religious organization known as the Order of Lorelei, who believe him to be the key to an ancient prophecy. Together with his companions, Luke attempts to discover the truth and significance of his own birth, as well as unravel the mystery of The Score, the prophecy that has bound humanity's actions for thousands of years.

The episodes were directed by Kenji Kodama and written by Akemi Omode. The first episode premiered in Japan on Tokyo MX on October 3, 2008. The episodes also aired on Animax, MBS, BS11, and CBC. The episodes were collected in DVD, Blu-ray and UMD format. The first volume was released on February 20, 2009 while the ninth and final volume was released on October 29, 2009.

On July 22, 2010, Anime News Network announced that the North American anime distributor Bandai Entertainment acquired the license to the Tales of the Abyss anime. Originally set to release on July 7, 2011, it was later delayed to October 11, 2011. Following the closure of Bandai Entertainment in 2012, Sunrise announced at their panel at Otakon 2013, that Funimation has rescued the series, along with a handful of other former Bandai Entertainment titles.

Two pieces of theme music were used for the episodes, one opening theme and one ending theme. The opening theme, "Karma" by Bump of Chicken, is the theme song of the source game. The ending theme is Bōken Suisei by Kurumi Enomoto.


Episode list

References

External links
 Official Tokyo MX TV Tales of the Abyss anime website 
 Official MBS Tales of the Abyss anime website 
 

Tales of the Abyss
Tales (video game series)